Heirs to Thievery is the fourth full-length album by American death metal band Misery Index. It was released by Relapse Records on May 11, 2010. It is the band's final album with lead guitarist Sparky Voyles.

Track listing

Personnel

Misery Index
Adam Jarvis – drums
Mark Klöppel – vocals, guitar
Jason Netherton – vocals, bass guitar
Sparky Voyles – guitar

Additional musicians
Mough Alvarado – vocals ("Day of the Dead")
John Gallagher – vocals ("Sleeping Giants")
Rich Johnson – vocals ("Embracing Extinction", "Heirs to Thievery")
Vince Matthews – vocals ("You Lose")
Erik Rutan – vocals ("The Illuminaught")

Production
Steve Wright – production, engineering
Misery Index – production
Noah Gary – additional engineering
Drew Lamond – additional engineering

References

External links 
 

2010 albums
Misery Index (band) albums
Relapse Records albums